Wheatland is the name of some places in the U.S. state of Wisconsin:
Wheatland, Kenosha County, Wisconsin, a town
Wheatland, Vernon County, Wisconsin, a town